The 2018 Drive for the Cure 200 presented by Blue Cross Blue Shield of North Carolina was the 28th stock car race of the 2018 NASCAR Xfinity Series season, the second race in the Round of 12, and the 37th iteration of the event. The race was held on Saturday, September 29, 2018, in Concord, North Carolina at the Charlotte Motor Speedway roval, a permanent 2.28 miles (3.67 km) road course, using part of the oval and part of the infield road course. The race took the scheduled 55 laps to complete. At race's end, Chase Briscoe of Stewart-Haas Racing with Biagi-DenBeste would dominate the late stages of the race to win his first ever career NASCAR Xfinity Series win and his first and only win of the season. To fill out the podium, Justin Marks of Chip Ganassi Racing and Austin Cindric of Team Penske would finish second and third, respectively.

Background 

For 2018, deviating from past NASCAR events at Charlotte, the race would utilize a road course configuration of Charlotte Motor Speedway, promoted and trademarked as the "Roval". The race would be contested over a scheduled distance of 55 laps, .

During July 2018 tests on the road course, concerns were raised over drivers "cheating" designated chicanes on the course. The chicanes were modified with additional tire barriers and rumble strips in order to encourage drivers to properly drive through them, and NASCAR will enforce drive-through penalties on drivers who illegally "short-cut" parts of the course. The chicanes will not be used during pace laps, nor will they be used during restarts.

Entry list

Practice

First practice 
The first practice session would occur on Thursday, September 27, at 11:00 AM EST and would last for two hours.

Second practice 
The second practice session would occur on Thursday, September 27, at 2:00 PM EST and would last for two hours.

Third practice 
The third practice session would occur on Friday, September 28, at 1:05 PM EST and would last for 50 minutes.

Fourth and final practice 
The fourth and final practice session, sometimes referred to as Happy Hour, would occur on Friday, September 28, at 3:05 PM EST and would last for 50 minutes.

Qualifying 
Qualifying would occur on Saturday, September 29, at 12:10 PM EST. Since the Charlotte Motor Speedway Roval is a road course, the qualifying system was a multi-car system that included two rounds. The first round was 25 minutes, where every driver would be able to set a lap within the 25 minutes. Then, the second round would consist of the fastest 12 cars in Round 1, and drivers would have 10 minutes to set a lap. Whoever set the fastest time in Round 2 would win the pole.

Tanner Berryhill of Obaika Racing would be the only driver to fail to qualify, not making a lap in the qualifying session.

Full qualifying results

Race results 
Stage 1 Laps: 15

Stage 2 Laps: 15

Stage 3 Laps: 20

References 

2018 NASCAR Xfinity Series
NASCAR races at Charlotte Motor Speedway
September 2018 sports events in the United States
2018 in sports in North Carolina